Watercliffe Meadow Community Primary School is a primary school in Sheffield, South Yorkshire, England. It is notable for changing its name from a "school" to "A place of learning" in January 2009, with staff at Watercliffe Meadow claiming that this was because, "the word school may have negative connotations for pupils and parents." The change was attacked for being too politically correct.

Name change
The criticised "change" of name from "school" to "A place for learning" was reported with varying degrees of inaccuracy as being an early decision when the new school was formed as a merge between three former primary schools: Shirecliffe, Busk Meadow and Watermead infant and junior schools, at a cost of £4.7 million. Linda Kingdon, the head teacher said: "This is Watercliffe Meadow, a place for learning. One reason was many of the parents of the children here had very negative connotations of school. Instead, we want this to be a place for family learning, where anyone can come. We were able to start from scratch and create a new type of learning experience. There are no whistles or bells or locked doors. We wanted to deinstitutionalise the place and bring the school closer to real life."

The name on the sign was criticised, with people arguing that the change is too politically correct. Whilst this was exaggerated by dint of the fact that the tabloid media reported, inaccurately, that the word school had been banned (and in fact it merely didn't appear on the sign and continues to be used daily by staff, parents and pupils) the slogan itself opened the school up to ridicule. There was also press emphasis on the name "change", when in fact the subtitle to the School (Watercliffe Meadow) has been fixed since before the material completion or opening of the premises. Further to this misrepresentation, Sheffield Star contacted Marie Clair from Plain English Campaign who said: "It's laughable. Do they think by changing the name they will change the environment? We all know what the building is. There is this whole political correctness agenda. Using unfamiliar words instead of a simple one, like 'school', will get in the way of children's ability to learn."

Richard Caborn, the Member of Parliament for Sheffield Central commented that: "I'm always open to new ideas, but the reality is education is about preparing young people to live in the real world. I just don't think the case has been made to drop the word school to a place of learning. I don't know why they have done it."

Andrew Sangar, Sheffield city council's cabinet member for children's services and lifelong learning said that, "It's a school, we consider it a school and that's how we refer to it. How a school chooses to manage and refer to itself is a matter for the board of governors and the community it serves and we're relaxed about that."

The school is usually referred to simply as "Watercliffe Meadow" by staff and pupils, including on its official website.

References

Primary schools in Sheffield
Community schools in Sheffield
Educational institutions established in 2008
2008 establishments in England